Islamic Peace Movement UK, more widely known as Islamic Movement UK or IMUK, is the largest Islamic organisation in the UK. It was formed in 1989 in Leeds by Mohammed Kilyam.

Ethos, aims and recent history
It is devoted to promote peace and unity amongst the citizens of the world, especially in the UK. It helps non-Muslims and Muslims alike and has many departments which help people struggling financially and in 2013 it set up The Islamic Movement UK Business Fund, to whom anybody from the UK could apply for a grant to help them set up a business. Its main aim however is to help establish a 'Muslim caliphate' a Muslim Empire, which ended nearly 100 years ago. In recent years it has become more active in Dawah work among Muslims, before it solely worked with non-Muslims, and solely devoted their Dawah efforts towards them. It works with many other faith organisations across the UK to help achieve social justice. It has an effective organisational structure with over 503 district branches across the UK.

In June 2013, the organisation, as a method of celebrating its 25 years of work, started to draw up plans for youth centres across the country. It decided to pilot the schemes in the coming January in two schools, The Kings School Peterborough and St Mary Magdalene Academy London. In January 2014 these centres chose two leaders Hafiz Hassan Khalid for the Kings Centre and Hafizah Umayrah Ali for the other.

Current board members
Chairman-Mohammed Kilyam
President- Mohammed Idris
Head of Communication- Hamad Kilyam
Head of Dawah Work- Sheikah Ghaybah Ali
Head of Finance- Ghafar Mahmood
Head of Logistics- Mel Gordon
Head of Recruitment and Organisation- Taybaah Runiyah

Non-Executive Board Members
Ali ibn Khayfah ibn Tulhah
Tanyah Kerring
Elizabeth Jaffar

References

Islamic organisations based in the United Kingdom